The Kamal Kumari National Award is an Indian Award given to individuals and groups in India for outstanding contribution to Art, Culture & Literature and Science & Technology. It was instituted by the Kamal Kumari Foundation in 1990 in memory of Kamal Kumari Barooah, the remarkable matriarch of the Khongiya Barooah family of Thengal, Assam. The foundation has till date a number of awardees. The first award was given to Sobha Brahma in 1991 in the category of Culture. The award carries a cash award of Rs.200,000, a trophy and a citation.

List of Awardees

See also
Kamal Kumari Barooah
The Kamal Kumari Foundation
Siva Prasad Barooah National Award

References

Kamal Kumari awards presented

External links
Official Website

Civil awards and decorations of Assam
Awards established in 1990
Indian art awards
1990 establishments in Assam